Joanne Ratcliffe (born 1962) and Kirste Jane Gordon (born 1968) were two Australian girls who went missing while attending an Australian rules football match at the Adelaide Oval on 25 August 1973. Their disappearance and presumed abduction and murder became one of South Australia's best-known crimes. The presumed murders are thought by South Australia Police and the media to be related to the disappearance of the Beaumont children in 1966.<ref>The Age, 27 August 1973</ref> The case is sometimes referred to as the Adelaide Oval abductions.

Disappearance
Joanne Ratcliffe went to the football game, between Norwood and North Adelaide, with her parents Les and Kathleen Ratcliffe, her older brother, and a family friend named "Frank". Kirste Gordon was at the game in the care of her maternal grandmother while her parents, Greg and Christine Gordon, were visiting friends with their younger daughter in Renmark. The two families were seated next to each other in the Sir Edwin Smith Stand.

Ratcliffe's parents and Gordon's grandmother, who were friends, allowed the two girls to go to the toilet together on two occasions that day. The Ratcliffe family rule was that children were not allowed to go to the toilet during the breaks in the game, or during the last quarter. After the girls left at around 3:45 pm, the Ratcliffes began searching from around 4:00. After an unsuccessful first attempt, Kathleen Ratcliffe was finally able to get an announcement made on the oval's PA system shortly after the game ended around 5:00 pm. The girls were reported missing to the police at 5:12 pm.

Investigation
Ratcliffe and Gordon were sighted several times in the 90 minutes after leaving their families - once when trying to attract a stray cat, once with other children, and later, apparently distressed and with an unknown man who was carrying Gordon. Witnesses, unaware of the kidnapping, assumed the suspect was simply a parent with his children. The girls disappeared after the last reported sighting on a bridge near the Adelaide Zoo. Another witness, however, later reported seeing them between North Adelaide railway station and Port Road, Thebarton. Despite searches, a $5,000 reward, and widespread media attention, the kidnapping quickly became a cold case. 

In 1979, Ratcliffe's father told the Coroners Court of Queensland that his daughter had been to the oval dozens of times, that she would not have left voluntarily, and that she knew how to use a telephone to call an emergency number. He said she had not met Gordon before that day, and he did not know her parents.

On the fortieth anniversary of the case, Ratcliffe's sister Suzie Wilkinson said, "The case has never been officially closed but I would like further investigations into it. I want investigations into more recent developments. I certainly want a little bit more logic put behind why police have dismissed evidence which has been put before them and why things haven't been followed up. We seem to be left in the dark. It might be 40 years to them and just another case, but to us it is 40 years of us not getting to watch Jo grow up. That's 40 years of not having a daughter, a sister, an aunty."

In 2014, a $1 million reward was offered by the South Australian government.

 Suspects 
Many of the suspects in the Beaumont children disappearance are also suspects in this case, including child killers Bevan Spencer von Einem and Derek Percy. Witness reports led police to believe that they were abducted by a middle-aged man. Further, the police sketch of the man last seen with the two girls resembles that of the man last seen with the Beaumont children.

Arthur Stanley Brown (1912–2002) is considered a suspect for both cases, as he bore a striking similarity to an identikit picture of the suspect for both cases. A witness reported seeing a man near the oval carrying a young girl while another older girl in distress followed. The woman first saw him for a single minute when aged 14, and then identified him 25 years later in December 1998 when she saw him on television.

Another possible suspect is Stanley Arthur Hart (25 January 1917 – 30 June 1999). Properties previously owned by Hart (one in Prospect, one at Yatina in the Mid North) were investigated in 2009 and again in 2015. He reportedly rarely missed a North Adelaide match, and a decade after the abduction he was found to be a child abuser.

In 2013 Ratcliffe's sister, Suzie Wilkinson, appealed to the authorities to look into the role that family friend "Frank" may have played in the disappearance of the girls. Frank had accompanied the families to the oval on the day of the girls' abduction, but may not have been formally questioned by police. Frank is alleged to have had intimate knowledge about the girls' routine behaviours during football match outings. Kathleen Ratcliffe said that Frank left his seat for approximately 30 minutes before the girl's disappearance, but later remained seated and did not participate when others formed search parties to look for them. Gordon's grandmother also took notice of Frank's behaviour during the search for the girls saying, "the other man stayed in his seat." Wilkinson expressed her desire that authorities continue to actively work on her sister's case.

See also
 List of people who disappeared

 References 

Further reading

 External links 
Kirste Gordon at the Doe NetworkJoanne Ratcliffe at the Doe Network''
Missing: Joanne Ratcliffe on Facebook, administered by Ratcliffe's sister Suzie

1962 births
1969 births
1970s missing person cases
1973 in Australia
August 1973 events in Australia
Crime in Adelaide
Missing Australian children
Possibly living people